Billy Quincy McCray (October 29, 1927 – June 2, 2012) was an American politician who served in the Kansas State Senate and Kansas House of Representatives as a Democrat.

McCray was born in Geary, Oklahoma and married in 1951. He had several children, including Melody McCray-Miller, who would follow in his footsteps by joining the Kansas House.

In the 1966 elections, he won a seat in the Kansas House, and served there for three terms before moving up to the Kansas Senate in the 1972 elections. He served three terms in the 29th district before leaving the legislature. During his term in office, McCray was the only African-American member of the Kansas Senate.

References

1927 births
2012 deaths
Democratic Party Kansas state senators
Democratic Party members of the Kansas House of Representatives
Politicians from Wichita, Kansas
20th-century American politicians
African-American state legislators in Kansas